Tess Amorim Coelho (born September 15, 1994) is a Brazilian actress. She is best known for the short film Eu Não Quero Voltar Sozinho and the film Hoje Eu Quero Voltar Sozinho, in which she played Giovana.

Filmography

Awards and nominations

References

External links 

1994 births
Living people
Actresses from São Paulo
Brazilian film actresses
Brazilian television actresses
Brazilian voice actresses
21st-century Brazilian actresses